Providence Island Sign Language (also known as Provisle, "Providencia Sign Language", or PISL) is a village sign language of the small island community of Providence Island in the Western Caribbean, off the coast of Nicaragua but belonging to Colombia.

It is believed that the sign language emerged in the late 19th or early 20th century. Brief sociological studies have suggested that deaf people on the island are regarded as inferior in mental ability; hearing people do not discuss complex ideas with them, and they hold a marginalized social position. Perhaps consequently, PISL is rather simplistic in comparison to other sign languages. Another possibility for the state of the language is that few deaf people communicate directly, meaning that almost all signing is mediated by the hearing population.

External links
Providence Island Sign Language by William Washabaugh (1991)

References
 Woodward, James. Attitudes toward deaf people on Providence Island, Journal article in: Sign Language Studies 7:18 (1978), pp. 49–68
 Woodward, James. Sign languages — Providence Island, in Gallaudet encyclopedia of deaf people and deafness. New York: McGraw-Hill, 1987., vol.3, pp. 103–104.
 Washabaugh, William; Woodward,James; DeSantis, Susan (1978): "Providence Island Sign: A Context-Dependent Language". In: Anthropological Linguistics, vol. 20, 95–109.

Sign languages of Colombia
Village sign languages